Henry Leo Barniville (10 April 1887 – 23 September 1960) was an Irish politician and surgeon.

Life and career
Barniville was born in 1887 in Belfast to John Banniville and Mary Burke.  He was educated at Rockwell College, County Tipperary and studied medicine at the National University of Ireland. After graduation in 1916, he worked as house surgeon at the Mater Misericordiae University Hospital in Dublin, eventually becoming senior surgeon at the hospital. He was professor of surgery at University College Dublin from 1928 to 1958.

He was elected to the new Irish Free State Seanad in 1922 for 3 years. He was re-elected in 1925 for a 12-year term and served until the Free State Seanad was abolished in 1936. When the new Seanad Éireann was established in 1937, he was elected by the National University constituency. He was re-elected at each subsequent election and served until his death in office in 1960.

He holds the record as the longest serving member of the Seanad, as he was a member for a total of 35 years, 11 months.

He died in Dublin on 23 September 1960.

References

1887 births
1960 deaths
Members of the 1922 Seanad
Members of the 1925 Seanad
Members of the 1928 Seanad
Members of the 1931 Seanad
Members of the 1934 Seanad
Members of the 2nd Seanad
Members of the 3rd Seanad
Members of the 4th Seanad
Members of the 5th Seanad
Members of the 6th Seanad
Members of the 7th Seanad
Members of the 8th Seanad
Members of the 9th Seanad
Politicians from County Kildare
Irish surgeons
Academics of University College Dublin
People educated at Rockwell College
Cumann na nGaedheal senators
Fine Gael senators
People of the Irish Civil War (Pro-Treaty side)
Members of Seanad Éireann for the National University of Ireland
20th-century surgeons